Persuasive writing is any written communication with the intention to convince or influence readers to believe in an idea or opinion and to do an action. Many writings such as criticisms, reviews, reaction papers, editorials, proposals, advertisements, and brochures use different ways of persuasion to influence readers. Persuasive writing can also be used in indoctrination.  It can be confused with opinion writing; however, it is much different. Although the main points of opinion and persuasive writing could essentially be the same, persuasive points are backed by facts while opinion points are backed by emotion.

It is a form of non-fiction writing the writer uses to develop logical arguments, making use of carefully chosen words and phrases.. But it's believed that some literature rooted in a fiction genre could also be intended as persuasive writings.

Common techniques in persuasive writing

Presenting strong evidence, such as facts and statistics, statements of expert authorities, and research findings, establishes credibility and authenticity. Readers will more likely be convinced to side with the writer's position or agree with their opinion if it is backed up by verifiable evidence. Concrete, relevant, and reasonable examples or anecdotes can enhance the writer's idea or opinion. They can be based on observations or from the writer's personal experience. Accurate, current, and balanced information adds to the credibility of persuasive writing. The writer does not only present evidence that favors their ideas, but they also acknowledge some evidence that opposes their own - this has been proven in psychology to have the greatest influence upon the reader. In the writing, though, their ideas would be sounder.

Categories of Persuasive Writing 
There are five categories of persuasive writing: rhetoric, craftsmanship, authenticity, reflexivity, and imagination. Rhetoric refers to the various writing styles authors use to marry language and data to persuade readers. Craftsmanship refers to how the authors utilize present information in a manner that makes their writing persuasive. Authenticity refers to the different tones and energy a writer utilizes to bring life to their work. Reflexivity is the balance a writer maintains for a piece of writing that is interesting and attention grabbing while it still being relevant and relatable to the reader's reality. Imagination relates to a writer's ability to create writing that allows readers to interpret the writing in their own way.

Ethos, Logos, and Pathos 
There are three aesthetic features to persuasive writing. Ethos is the appeal to credibility. It convinces the audience of the credibility of the writer. The writer's expertise on their subject matter lends to such credibility. The level of education and profession of the writer also come into play. Logos is the appeal to logic and reason. It is the most commonly accepted mode in persuasion because it aims to be scientific in its approach to argumentation. In writing, facts are presented logically and faulty logic is avoided. Pathos is the appeal to emotion. This aims to convince the audience by appealing to human emotions. Emotions such as sympathy, anger, and sadness motivate humans; using pathos will get the audience emotionally invested in the subject of the writing.

Argumentation is another essential feature to persuasive writing. Researches found that recognizing opposing points of view and providing substantial rebuttals makes a paper much more convincing and persuasive. The Toulmin Model of Argumentation is credited as the ideal framework for argumentation. It consists of claim, data, warrant, backing qualifier and rebuttal.

Strategies for Persuasive Writing 
To improve persuasive writing skills, certain strategies such as the STOP and DARE (SRSD) can be employed. The SRSD helps students improve their persuasive writing skills and consists of six stages: Discuss, Develop, Model, Memorize, Support and Perform. The first step entails explaining what the SRSD strategy is, the following step is to develop an idea of what a good essay is. The third step is using an example of how to draft and write a good essay, next is to memorize all the tools learned in the SRSD strategy using games. The fifth step is for students to work in groups to put all of it to practice, and finally is to try making a persuasive piece of work individually.

There are numerous excellent examples of persuasive writing across different fields. The role of airborne transmissions on antimicrobial resistance is an excellent example of persuasive writing in scientific literature.

See also
 Assertiveness
 Editorial
 Letter to the editor
 Manifesto
 Open letter
 Opinion journalism
 Opinion piece

References

Advertisements
Composition (language)
Criticism
Interpersonal communication
Opinion journalism
Persuasion
Political communication
Promotion and marketing communications
Writing